Gerardo Daniel "Tata" Martino (born 20 November 1962) is an Argentine professional football manager and former player.

Martino played mostly for Newell's Old Boys in his native Rosario. He holds the record of appearances with the team playing a total of 505 matches in all official competitions. He was also selected in a fan's poll as Newell's best player throughout the club's history.

Martino was chosen to replace Tito Vilanova as manager of FC Barcelona at the start of the 2013–14 season, but announced his resignation on 17 May 2014, though his side finished runner-up in both the Copa del Rey and La Liga that season. In 2015, he led Argentina to the Copa América Final, only to be defeated by hosts Chile on penalties. His team also finished as runners-up in the Copa América Centenario, again losing to the defending champion Chile on penalties. On 5 July 2016, Martino resigned from the Argentina national team.

He was named the head coach of Atlanta United FC, a Major League Soccer expansion team that began play in 2017. Martino led the team to an MLS Cup victory in their second season and was named the MLS Coach of the Year before departing for the Mexico national team. He spent three years leading the side and left Mexico following the 2022 FIFA World Cup.

Coaching career

Paraguay national team
Martino was assigned as head coach of the Paraguay national football team in February 2007, replacing Uruguayan Anibal "Maño" Ruiz. His knowledge and success while coaching Paraguayan clubs were the parameters that positioned him as the best option for the job (other candidates were Nery Pumpido and Miguel Ángel Russo). Previously, Martino had won the Paraguayan league four times from 2002 till 2006.

In 2008, Martino was linked for vacant managerial position of Iran Pro League side Steel Azin but the deal was cancelled due to personal reasons. On 5 July 2010, Martino announced that he would be stepping down as Paraguay coach on their return from the 2010 FIFA World Cup in which he led Paraguay to quarter-finals. Martino confirmed that with his four-year contract expiring, he would not be extending his spell in charge of the national side. However, on 10 July 2010, Martino agreed to stay on as Paraguay coach until after the 2011 Copa America, in which Paraguay were runners-up after losing to Uruguay in the final.

Newell's Old Boys
After Hernán Darío Gómez's departure from the Colombia national team, Martino received a proposition to coach the team but turned it down, opting instead to coach Newell's Old Boys, one of his former clubs as a player and a club which at the time was dangerously close to relegation to the Primera B Nacional, the second tier of Argentine football. However, a series of impressive results under Martino secured top-flight status for Newell's and Martino's reputation as a coach increased quite significantly.

Following his excellent first season at Newell's, Martino won the 2013 Torneo Final, the second and final stage of the Argentine Primera División season and reached the semi-finals of the 2013 Copa Libertadores. As a result, Martino won further plaudits as a coach, having transformed Newell's from a team facing relegation on his arrival to a title-winning side, in addition to the arguably more impressive feat of reaching the 2013 Copa Libertadores semi-final, the pinnacle club competition organized by CONMEBOL. It was this startling turnaround that further increased Martino's stock as a coach, and his achievements at Newell's soon caught the attention of various clubs in Europe, including FC Barcelona.

Barcelona

On 7 July 2013, Martino was confirmed as manager of Spanish club Barcelona to replace Tito Vilanova who resigned three days earlier. He signed a two-year deal at Barcelona.
His first competitive game in charge of Barça was on 18 August 2013 against Levante, a game which Barcelona won 7–0 on the opening weekend of the 2013–14 La Liga season. On 26 October 2013, Martino won 2–1 against rivals Real Madrid at the Camp Nou, winning his first Clásico as a Barcelona manager. Three days later, Barcelona went on to win 0–3 at Celta de Vigo and Martino became the first coach in Barcelona history to not lose a game in their first 16 matches. On 20 November, Martino's unbeaten start as Barcelona coach came to an end after his 21st game in charge, as Barcelona lost 2–1 away at Ajax in the 2013–14 UEFA Champions League. After conceding the 2013–14 La Liga title on the last day of the season to Atlético Madrid, Martino announced he was to leave his role after just one year in charge during which he did not manage to win any major trophy except the Spanish Super Cup.

Argentina national team
On 12 August 2014, Martino was introduced as the new manager for the Argentina national team, succeeding Alejandro Sabella who took the side into the final against Germany at the World Cup in Brazil. In the 2015 Copa América, he reached the final, in which Argentina were runners-up after losing to hosts Chile on penalties. They also finished as runners-up in the Copa América Centenario Final on 26 June 2016 against Chile, again losing on penalties. On 5 July 2016, Martino resigned.

Atlanta United
After departing from Argentina, Martino was announced as Major League Soccer expansion team Atlanta United's inaugural season head coach on 27 September 2016. On 23 October 2018, Martino announced that he would not renew his contract with Atlanta United following the conclusion of the 2018 MLS season, citing personal reasons. He was expected to sign with the Mexico national team. Atlanta defeated the Portland Timbers in the MLS Cup, winning their first league title in Martino's last match with the club.

Mexico national team
On 7 January 2019, Martino was announced as head coach of the Mexico national team in his return to international management since leaving Argentina in May 2016. On 22 March, Martino won his first match with Mexico with a 3–1 win over Chile in a friendly. Later in the same year, Martino and Mexico won the CONCACAF Gold Cup over rivals the United States in a 1–0 victory, his first national title. But in 2021 Martino lost both 2021 CONCACAF Nations League Final and CONCACAF Gold Cup to the United States. In the 2022 FIFA World Cup, Martino led Mexico to their biggest failure in 28 years, since Mexico finished third in their group behind Poland on goal difference, to be their first exit from the group stage since 1978. Following their last group match against Saudi Arabia, 
Martino fulfilled his contract as head coach of Mexico.

Managerial style
Gerardo Martino prefers to play a very high pressing and an attacking style of football. At Barcelona, Martino continued the club's preferred style of play tiki-taka along with his own tactics. All of Martino's teams have the same distinguishable traits: they play attack-minded football, they are creative and the style is based on quick passing. In addition, Martino's teams also pressure high up the pitch, play out from the back and depend on their youth systems.

Managerial statistics

Personal life
Gerardo Martino is of Italian descent. His grandparents are from Ripacandida, Basilicata. Martino is married to fellow Argentine María Angélica.

Honours

Player
Newell's Old Boys
Argentine Primera División: 1987–88, 1990–91, 1992 Clausura

Manager
Libertad
Paraguayan Primera División: 2002, 2003, 2006

Cerro Porteño
Paraguayan Primera División: 2004

Newell's Old Boys
Argentine Primera División: 2013 Final

Paraguay
Copa América Runner-up: 2011

Barcelona
Supercopa de España: 2013
Copa del Rey Runner-up: 2013–14

Argentina
Copa América Runner-up: 2015, 2016

Atlanta United
MLS Cup: 2018

Mexico
CONCACAF Gold Cup: 2019
CONCACAF Gold Cup Runner-up: 2021
CONCACAF Nations League Runner-up: 2019–20

Individual
South American Coach of the Year: 2007
MLS All-Star: 2018
MLS Coach of the Year: 2018

References

External links

 
 

1962 births
Living people
Argentine people of Lucanian descent
Argentine people of Italian descent
Footballers from Rosario, Santa Fe
Argentine footballers
Association football midfielders
Newell's Old Boys footballers
CD Tenerife players
Club Atlético Lanús footballers
O'Higgins F.C. footballers
Barcelona S.C. footballers
Argentine Primera División players
La Liga players
Chilean Primera División players
Ecuadorian Serie A players
Argentina youth international footballers
Argentina under-20 international footballers
Argentina international footballers
Argentine expatriate footballers
Argentine expatriate sportspeople in Spain
Argentine expatriate sportspeople in Chile
Argentine expatriate sportspeople in Ecuador
Expatriate footballers in Spain
Expatriate footballers in Chile
Expatriate footballers in Ecuador
Argentine football managers
Almirante Brown de Arrecifes managers
Club Atlético Platense managers
Instituto managers
Club Libertad managers
Cerro Porteño managers
Club Atlético Colón managers
Paraguay national football team managers
Newell's Old Boys managers
FC Barcelona managers
Argentina national football team managers
Atlanta United FC coaches
Mexico national football team managers
Primera B Nacional managers
Paraguayan Primera División managers
Argentine Primera División managers
La Liga managers
Major League Soccer coaches
2010 FIFA World Cup managers
2011 Copa América managers
2015 Copa América managers
Copa América Centenario managers
2019 CONCACAF Gold Cup managers
2021 CONCACAF Gold Cup managers
Argentine expatriate football managers
Argentine expatriate sportspeople in Paraguay
Argentine expatriate sportspeople in the United States
Argentine expatriate sportspeople in Mexico
Expatriate football managers in Paraguay
Expatriate football managers in Spain
Expatriate soccer managers in the United States
Expatriate football managers in Mexico
2022 FIFA World Cup managers